Aldo Alemán Reyes (born June 10, 1993, in Xalapa, Veracruz) is a Mexican professional footballer who plays as a forward, most recently for Inter Playa del Carmen.

External links

 

Living people
1993 births
Mexican footballers
Association football forwards
Albinegros de Orizaba footballers
C.F. Mérida footballers
Atlante F.C. footballers
Pioneros de Cancún footballers
Inter Playa del Carmen players
Liga MX players
Ascenso MX players
Tercera División de México players
Footballers from Veracruz
People from Xalapa